The Deoni is an Indian breed of draught cattle. It is named after the taluk of Deoni in the Latur district of Maharashtra state, and is distributed mainly in the Latur, Nanded, Osmanabad and Parbhani districts of the Marathwada region of Maharashtra, as well as the Bidar district of Karnataka.

References 

Cattle breeds originating in India
Animal husbandry in Maharashtra
Cattle breeds